The 2003 MBNA Armed Forces Family 400 was the 13th stock car race of the 2003 NASCAR Winston Cup Series season and the 35th iteration of the event. The race was held on Sunday, June 1, 2003, in Dover, Delaware at Dover International Speedway, a 1-mile (1.6 km) permanent oval-shaped racetrack. The race took the scheduled 400 laps to complete. At race's end, Penske Racing South driver Ryan Newman would manage to dominate the late stages of the race to take his third career NASCAR Winston Cup Series victory and his second victory of the season. To fill out the top 3, Hendrick Motorsports driver Jeff Gordon and Joe Gibbs Racing driver Bobby Labonte would finish second and third, respectively.

Background 

Dover International Speedway is an oval race track in Dover, Delaware, United States that has held at least two NASCAR races since it opened in 1969. In addition to NASCAR, the track also hosted USAC and the NTT IndyCar Series. The track features one layout, a 1-mile (1.6 km) concrete oval, with 24° banking in the turns and 9° banking on the straights. The speedway is owned and operated by Dover Motorsports.

The track, nicknamed "The Monster Mile", was built in 1969 by Melvin Joseph of Melvin L. Joseph Construction Company, Inc., with an asphalt surface, but was replaced with concrete in 1995. Six years later in 2001, the track's capacity moved to 135,000 seats, making the track have the largest capacity of sports venue in the mid-Atlantic. In 2002, the name changed to Dover International Speedway from Dover Downs International Speedway after Dover Downs Gaming and Entertainment split, making Dover Motorsports. From 2007 to 2009, the speedway worked on an improvement project called "The Monster Makeover", which expanded facilities at the track and beautified the track. After the 2014 season, the track's capacity was reduced to 95,500 seats.

Entry list 

 (R) denotes rookie driver.

Practice 
Originally, three practice sessions were scheduled to be held, with one practice on Friday, May 30, and two on Saturday, May 31. However, due to rain, the final Saturday session was cancelled.

First practice 
The first practice session was held on Friday, May 30, at 11:05 AM EST. The session would last for one hour and 55 minutes.

Final practice 
The final practice session, sometimes referred to as Happy Hour, was held on Saturday, May 31, at 9:30 AM EST. The session would last for 45 minutes.

Qualifying 
Qualifying was held on Friday, May 30, at 2:35 PM EST. Each driver would have two laps to set a fastest time; the fastest of the two would count as their official qualifying lap. Positions 1-36 would be decided on time, while positions 37-43 would be based on provisionals. Six spots are awarded by the use of provisionals based on owner's points. The seventh is awarded to a past champion who has not otherwise qualified for the race. If no past champ needs the provisional, the next team in the owner points will be awarded a provisional.

Derrike Cope was the only driver to fail to qualify.

Full qualifying results

Race results

References 

2003 NASCAR Winston Cup Series
NASCAR races at Dover Motor Speedway
June 2003 sports events in the United States
2003 in sports in Delaware